The 2002 United States Senate election in New Mexico was held on November 5, 2002. Incumbent Republican U.S. Senator Pete Domenici won re-election to a sixth term. , this is the last time a Republican has won a U.S. Senate election in New Mexico.

Democratic primary

Candidates 
 Gloria Tristani, member of the Federal Communications Commission and former Corporation Commissioner of New Mexico
 Francesa Lobato
 Don E. Durham (write-in)

Results

Republican primary

Candidates 
 Pete Domenici, incumbent U.S. Senator
 Orlin G. Cole (write-in)

Results

General election

Candidates 
 Pete Domenici (R), incumbent U.S. Senator
 Gloria Tristani (D), member of the Federal Communications Commission and former Corporation Commissioner of New Mexico

Predictions

Results

See also 
 2002 United States Senate election

References 

2002 New Mexico elections
New Mexico
2002